"The Writing on the Wall" is a song by the English heavy metal band Iron Maiden. The song was released on 15 July 2021 alongside a music video, and served as the lead single from their seventeenth studio album Senjutsu. It was also the band's first single since 2016's "Empire of the Clouds".

It was elected by Loudwire as the 14th best metal song of 2021.

Music video 
The song's music video was directed by Nicos Livesey from BlinkInk, a London based animation studio, in collaboration with Bruce Dickinson and former Pixar executives and long-standing Maiden fans Mark Andrews and Andrew Gordon via weekly Zoom meetings. The video is a story written by Dickinson, inspired by the biblical stories of Belshazzar's feast and Daniel, as well as other biblical references featuring the band's mascot, Eddie, in various styles influenced by the artwork of previous albums. The visual effects were provided by BlinkInk with fans of the band reaching out with storyboard ideas from across the globe.

Personnel 

Iron Maiden
 Bruce Dickinson – vocals
 Dave Murray – guitars
 Janick Gers – guitars
 Adrian Smith – guitars
 Steve Harris – bass
 Nicko McBrain – drums

Production
 Kevin Shirley – production, mixing
 Steve Harris – co-production

Charts

References

External links
 

Iron Maiden songs
2021 singles
Songs written by Adrian Smith
Songs written by Bruce Dickinson
Song recordings produced by Kevin Shirley
Parlophone singles